West Greenlandic Pidgin is an extinct Greenlandic-based contact language once used between the Inuit of Greenland and European traders. The vocabulary is mostly Greenlandic. Although words from Germanic languages were incorporated over the course of contact with Europeans, most of the words that are not Inuit came from other local trade languages. West Greenlandic Pidgin has a vastly simplified grammar, and sounds that were unfamiliar to Northern Europeans, such as r and q, were lost. For example, orsoq 'blubber' became oksok 'bacon'. However, other sounds have since been lost from Greenlandic, such as sh (merged into s in modern Greenlandic) and consonant clusters: nigsik has become nieksik 'hook', but in modern Greenlandic is nissik.

References

Marianne Mithun (2001) The Languages of Native North America, p 593ff
Hein van der Voort, "Eskimo pidgin", in Arends, Muysken, & Smith (eds), 1995, Pidgins and Creoles: an introduction

Extinct languages of Greenland
North America Native-based pidgins and creoles
Languages extinct in the 19th century